Dirocoremia is a genus of beetles in the family Cerambycidae, containing the following species:

 Dirocoremia bruchi (Gounelle, 1905)
 Dirocoremia ingae (Marques, 1994)
 Dirocoremia simplicipes (Gounelle, 1911)

References

Rhopalophorini